Roger Laurin (born 1936 in Montreal, Quebec) is a trainer of Thoroughbred racehorses in the United States and Canada. He has trained Champions Numbered Account, the 1971 American Champion Two-Year-Old Filly, and Chief's Crown, the 1984 American Champion Two-Year-Old Colt and Breeders' Cup Juvenile winner.

A family business
Roger Laurin grew up in the Thoroughbred racing business as the son of U.S. Racing Hall of Fame trainer Lucien Laurin. He came into prominence in 1964 when he took charge of the race conditioning of a filly named Miss Cavandish. Purchased by Harry S. Nichols for $1,500 because she had a severe "toeing in" problem, under Laurin Miss Cavandish became one of the top two fillies racing in the United States in 1964, finishing second in the balloting for 1964 American Champion 3-Year-Old Filly honors behind future U.S. Racing Hall of Fame inductee Tosmah.

By 1966, Laurin was training for major owners such as Harry Guggenheim's Cain Hoy Stable and Penny Chenery's Meadow Stable. In 1971, he was offered the job as head trainer for Ogden Phipps, a major stable owner and part of the Phipps family, one of America's most prominent racing families. At the time, Laurin had conditioned future Hall of Fame inductee Riva Ridge for racing up to the week before he broke his maiden in his two-year-old debut. It was on his recommendation that Penny Chenery hired his father to replace as the Meadow Stable trainer. In addition to his duties for Ogden Phipps, Laurin had been training horses owned by James Moseley, a member of The Jockey Club and a co-owner and Chairman of the Board of Directors of Suffolk Downs racetrack in Boston, Massachusetts. For Moseley, he most notably conditioned the filly Drumtop, who won numerous top stakes and broke three track records in 1971. For Ogden Phipps, Laurin trained Numbered Account to a 1971 Eclipse Award as the Champion Two-Year-Old Filly.

In the late 1970s,  Laurin was training for owners such as Reginald N. Webster, a longtime stable owner for whom Lucien Laurin had won the Belmont Stakes with Amberoid, and for the American racing division of Canadian E. P. Taylor's Windfields Farm. In 1984, he conditioned Chief's Crown to an outstanding season of racing in which he won the Breeders' Cup Juvenile and was voted American Champion Two-Year-Old Colt. After another good year in 1985 with Chief’s Crown finishing 3-2-3 in the U.S. Triple Crown series, then winning the Marlboro Cup Invitational Handicap and Travers Stakes, Laurin retired. He did maintain his trainer’s license while devoting much of his time to the breeding of Thoroughbreds. In 1992, while racing on a very limited basis, he won the Victoriana Stakes at Woodbine Racetrack in Toronto with a horse he bred and owned. In August 2006, he returned again to race at Saratoga Race Course with two of his own horses.

Still maintaining some involvement with the race conditioning of Thoroughbreds, Laurin had a stable under his care at Fort Erie Racetrack in August 2011.

References

1936 births
Living people
Canadian horse trainers
American horse trainers
Sportspeople from Miami
Sportspeople from Montreal